Robert Braithwaite may refer to:
 Robert Braithwaite (bryologist) (1824–1917), English botanist
 Robert Braithwaite (engineer) (1943–2019), British engineer
 Robert Braithwaite (judge) (born 1950), United States District Court judge

See also 
 Braithwaite (surname)